Intellectual Sacrifice and Other Mimetic Paradoxes is a 2018 book about sacrifice by Paolo Diego Bubbio, in which the author examines Rene Girard’s mimetic theory. This book collects Bubbio's most significant writings on the topic, and is presented as his intellectual journey over two decades (from 1999 to 2019) through mimetic theory.

Content
The first part is a revised translation of a short book originally published in Italian in 1999: the central thesis here is that philosophy and religion can be regarded as subjects involved in a mimetic rivalry on the intellectual level. In the chapters of the second part of the book, Bubbio addresses several topics developing the dialogue between Girard’s mimetic theory and the Post-Kantian philosophical tradition, and in particular contemporary philosophical hermeneutics. In the final chapter, Bubbio advocates for the need of developing mimetic theory into Hermeneutic Mimetic Theory (or HMT). According to Bubbio, HMT can solve some of the internal problems of mimetic theory in its original version, and at the same time it can offer a meaningful contribution to the development of a new paradigm of the “I”.

See also
Sacrifice in the Post-Kantian Tradition

References

External links 
 Intellectual Sacrifice and Other Mimetic Paradoxes

2018 non-fiction books
Books about sacrifice
Continental philosophy literature
English-language books
Philosophy books
Michigan State University Press books
Books by Diego Bubbio
1999 non-fiction books